Psorthaspis is a genus of spider wasps in the family Pompilidae. There are more than 30 described species in Psorthaspis.

Species
These 36 species belong to the genus Psorthaspis:

 Psorthaspis alternata (Banks, 1931)
 Psorthaspis australis (Banks, 1910)
 Psorthaspis avinoffi (Banks, 1938)
 Psorthaspis banksi Bradley, 1944
 Psorthaspis bequaerti Bradley
 Psorthaspis bioculata Bradley, 1944
 Psorthaspis bradleyi Banks, 1954
 Psorthaspis brimleyi (Malloch, 1928)
 Psorthaspis canipennis Bradley, 1944
 Psorthaspis coelestis Bradley, 1944
 Psorthaspis colombiae Bradley, 1944
 Psorthaspis conocephala Bradley
 Psorthaspis elegans (Cresson, 1865)
 Psorthaspis eubule (Cameron, 1893)
 Psorthaspis formosa (Smith, 1862)
 Psorthaspis gloria Snelling, 1995
 Psorthaspis guatemalae Bradley, 1944
 Psorthaspis hispaniolae Bradley, 1944
 Psorthaspis laevifrons (Cresson, 1869)
 Psorthaspis legata (Cresson, 1867)
 Psorthaspis levis Bradley
 Psorthaspis luctuosa (Banks, 1910)
 Psorthaspis magna (Banks, 1910)
 Psorthaspis mariae (Cresson, 1867)
 Psorthaspis nahuatlensis Bradley
 Psorthaspis naomi (Smith, 1855)
 Psorthaspis nigriceps (Banks, 1933)
 Psorthaspis picta (Kohl, 1886)
 Psorthaspis planata (Fox, 1892)
 Psorthaspis portiae (Rohwer, 1920)
 Psorthaspis purpuripennis (Cresson, 1865)
 Psorthaspis regalis (Smith, 1862)
 Psorthaspis sanguinea (Smith, 1855)
 Psorthaspis texana (Cresson, 1872)
 Psorthaspis unicus (Cresson, 1867)
 Psorthaspis vicina (Cresson, 1872)

References

External links

 

Pompilinae